Qezeljeh-ye Aq Emam (also Romanized as Qezeljeh-ye Āq Emām and Qezelcheh-ye Āq Emām) is a village in Nezamabad Rural District, in the Central District of Azadshahr County, Golestan Province, Iran. At the 2016 census, its population was 2,586, dispersed throughout 623 families.

References 

Populated places in Azadshahr County